New Chicago is a town in Hobart Township, Lake County, Indiana, United States. The population was 2,035 at the 2010 census.

History
New Chicago was platted in 1893. A post office was opened at New Chicago in 1907, and remained in operation until it was discontinued in 1917.

Geography
New Chicago is located at  (41.557860, -87.273801).

Demographics

2010 census
As of the census of 2010, there were 2,035 people, 763 households, and 487 families living in the town. The racial makeup of the town was 81.0% White, 2.2% African American, 0.7% Native American, 0.7% Asian, 10.0% from other races, and 5.3% from two or more races. Hispanic or Latino of any race were 27.4% of the population.

There were 763 households, of which 35.1% had children under the age of 18 living with them, 38.7% were married couples living together, 17.3% had a female householder with no husband present, 7.9% had a male householder with no wife present, and 36.2% were non-families. 29.0% of all households were made up of individuals, and 8.9% had someone living alone who was 65 years of age or older. The average household size was 2.67 and the average family size was 3.29.

The median age in the town was 33.9 years. 27.5% of residents were under the age of 18; 8.1% were between the ages of 18 and 24; 29% were from 25 to 44; 24.4% were from 45 to 64; and 11.1% were 65 years of age or older. The gender makeup of the town was 50.0% male and 50.0% female.

2000 census
As of the census of 2000, there were 2,063 people, 826 households, and 532 families living in the town. The racial makeup of the town was 87.64% White, 0.53% African American, 0.73% Native American, 0.24% Asian, 8.92% from other races, and 1.94% from two or more races. Hispanic or Latino of any race were 16.72% of the population.

There were 826 households, out of which 31.2% had children under the age of 18 living with them, 43.7% were married couples living together, 13.2% had a female householder with no husband present, and 35.5% were non-families. 29.8% of all households were made up of individuals, and 10.2% had someone living alone who was 65 years of age or older. The average household size was 2.50 and the average family size was 3.06.

In the town, the population was spread out, with 26.0% under the age of 18, 11.0% from 18 to 24, 30.0% from 25 to 44, 22.1% from 45 to 64, and 11.1% who were 65 years of age or older. The median age was 32 years. For every 100 females, there were 95.2 males. For every 100 females age 18 and over, there were 93.5 males.

The median income for a household in the town was $32,759, and the median income for a family was $36,852. Males had a median income of $36,400 versus $22,045 for females. The per capita income for the town was $16,342. About 10.6% of families and 14.2% of the population were below the poverty line, including 18.9% of those under age 18 and 6.8% of those age 65 or over.

Education
Residents are zoned to River Forest Community School Corporation.

Public libraries
Lake County Public Library operates the Lake Station - New Chicago Branch at 2007 Central Avenue in nearby Lake Station.

References

Towns in Lake County, Indiana
Towns in Indiana
populated places established in 1893
1893 establishments in Indiana